Min H. Kao is a Taiwanese-American electrical engineer, billionaire businessman, and philanthropist. He is the co-founder of Garmin, with Gary Burrell, and its chairman.

In 2011, Kao was elected a member of the National Academy of Engineering for leadership in developing and commercializing compact GPS navigation devices.

Early life
Min H. Kao was born in 1949 in Zhushan, Nantou, a small town in Taiwan.  He graduated from the National Taiwan University, and earned a doctorate in electrical engineering from the University of Tennessee in 1977.

Career
Kao undertook research for NASA and the United States Army. He was subsequently a systems analyst for Teledyne Systems, an algorithm designer for Magnavox Advanced Products, and an engineering group leader for King Radio Corporation. He also worked for AlliedSignal.

In 1989, with Gary Burrell, Kao co-founded Garmin, a company best known for manufacturing devices that use the Global Positioning System.

Kao stepped down as CEO of Garmin in 2012, but remains executive chairman and a member of the board.

Philanthropy
In 2005, Kao gave $17.5 million to the College of Engineering of the University of Tennessee, $12.5 million of which was designated for the construction of a new facility. In May 2007, groundbreaking ceremonies were conducted for the new Min Kao Electrical Engineering and Computer Science Building. The building was dedicated in March 2012.

In 2014, Kao donated $1 million to the University of Kansas College of Engineering for the building of electrical and computer engineering design labs. In 2015, Kao donated $1 million to the Kansas State University College of Engineering for building four labs.

Personal life
Kao is married to Fan Kao. They have a son, Ken Kao, who is a film producer, and a daughter, Jen Kao, who is a fashion designer. They reside in Leawood, Kansas. In 2011, he purchased an apartment in 15 Central Park West, Manhattan, New York City. He is selling his Kansas City area residence for $5 million as he spends the majority of his time in Manhattan.

As of February 2020, his personal wealth was estimated at $4.1 billion.

References

1949 births
Living people
People from Nantou County
People from Leawood, Kansas
Taiwanese emigrants to the United States
American people of Chinese descent
National Taiwan University alumni
University of Tennessee alumni
American company founders
American technology chief executives
Businesspeople from Kansas
Garmin
American philanthropists
American billionaires
People associated with the Global Positioning System